Tenthredo notha, a common sawfly, is a species belonging to the family Tenthredinidae subfamily Tenthrediniinae.

Distribution
This species is mainly present in British Isles, Bulgaria, Croatia, Czech Republic, France, Germany, Italy, Austria, Belgium, Slovakia, Sweden, Switzerland, Poland, Russia, Ukraine and Greece.

Description
These quite large sawflies have a lemon-yellow abdomen with black markings. This species is very similar to Tenthredo arcuata and Tenthredo brevicornis.

Biology
They can be encountered from June through September feeding on small insects and on nectar and pollen of flowers (especially on Apiaceae species).

The larvae mainly feed on clover (Trifolium repens), they overwinter as eonymph, pupating and emerging the following Spring.

References

Tenthredinidae
Insects described in 1814
Taxa named by Johann Christoph Friedrich Klug